Mitromorpha alba is a species of sea snail, a marine gastropod mollusk in the family Mitromorphidae.

The variety Mitromorpha alba var. axiscalpta Verco, 1909is a synonym of Mitromorpha axiscalpta Verco, 1909 (original rank)

Description
The length of the shell attains 4.4 mm.

The small, solid shell is biconical to cylindro-fusiform. It contains four whorls. The protoconch is blunt. The colour is white. The whorls show close revolving cords, sometimes decussated with radial riblets. No varix. The outer lip is thin. The sinus is evanescent. The columella is incrassate, with an indistinct single or double plication. The siphonal canal is wide and short,. The aperture is lyrate within.

Distribution
This marine species occurs off Tasmania, Australia, and off Taiwan

References

 Petterd, Journal of Conchyology., ii., 1879, p. 104.
 Tate and May, Proc. Linn. Soc. N.S.W., xxvi., 1904, pp. 372, 455
 Pritchard and Gatliff, Proc. Roy. Soc. Vict., xii..1899, p. 104, pi. viii., fig. 6, and xviii., 1906, p. 51

External links
 Verco, J.C. 1909. Notes on South Australian marine Mollusca with descriptions of new species. Part XII. Transactions of the Royal Society of South Australia 33: 293–342   
 

alba
Gastropods described in 1879